New York's 52nd State Assembly district is one of the 150 districts in the New York State Assembly. It has been represented by Democrat Jo Anne Simon since 2015 who is seeking re-election.

Geography
The district includes portions of Brooklyn Heights, Downtown Brooklyn, Cobble Hill, Carroll Gardens, Gowanus, Park Slope, Boerum Hill and DUMBO in Brooklyn.

Recent election results

2022

2020

2018

2016

2014

2012

References

52
Politics of Brooklyn